Son of Sinbad is a 1955 American adventure film directed by Ted Tetzlaff. It takes place in the Middle East and consists of a wide variety of characters, including over 127 women.

The film was shot in 1953 and planned to be released in 3D. Because of difficulties with the Motion Picture Production Code, studio head Howard Hughes shelved the film until 1955, when it was converted to the Tushinsky SuperScope process, in 2-D (flat).  It is Vincent Price's fourth and final 3-D film.

Dale Robertson (as Sinbad) co-stars with Sally Forrest and Price, as well as Lili St. Cyr, a well-known stripteaser of the 1950s.

Plot
In ancient Baghdad, poet Omar Khayyám wanders the streets in search of his friend, Sinbad, the son and namesake of Sinbad the Sailor, and finds him outside the Khalif's palace. Although the Khalif has offered a reward for his capture, the roguish Sinbad ignores Omar's warnings and nonchalantly sneaks into the palace. Spouting Omar's poetry, Sinbad romances Nerissa, one of the Khalif's harem girls, but is exposed by a slave.

Both Sinbad and Omar are caught and brought before the Khalif for sentencing. Also on trial are Greek scholar Simon Aristides, and his daughter Kristina, Sinbad's childhood friend, who has been wrongfully accused of stealing. After the Khalif orders that Sinbad and Omar be executed, his advisor, Jiddah, persuades him to meet with Murad, the ambassador to Tamerlane, a Tartar leader whose forces are threatening to invade Baghdad. Murad boldly informs the Khalif that the Tartars will soon be storming the city and demands that he and his men be entertained in the meantime.

Anxious to save Kristina, Sinbad reveals to the Khalif that Simon possesses the formula for an explosive called "Greek fire" and will share it with the Khalif in exchange for Simon's, Kristina's, Omar's and his freedom. The Khalif refuses to release Sinbad and Omar, but while they are incarcerated in the dungeon, Simon and Kristina give the ruler a private demonstration of Greek fire.

As protection, Simon has entrusted the formula to Kristina, who can recite the instructions only while hypnotized. In front of the Khalif, Simon hypnotizes Kristina, who then gives her father directions for mixing the various bottled ingredients. Unknown to them, Jiddah is in cahoots with Murad, and both men are eavesdropping on the proceedings. Although Jiddah and Murad can hear Kristina telling her father how much of each item to use, they cannot ascertain the chemicals being poured by Simon.

Meanwhile, the Khalif, ecstatic about the explosive, agrees to Simon's demand that Sinbad and Omar be freed in the morning. That night, Kristina confides in Ameer that she wants to marry Sinbad and asks her to tell him about his imminent release. Although jealous, Ameer delivers the message to Sinbad, but when she returns to Kristina's chambers, she finds Kristina gone and Simon murdered. Ameer sees Murad fleeing with Kristina and Simon's chemicals and sends a message via carrier pigeon before being caught by Jiddah.

While torturing Ameer to reveal the bird's destination, Jiddah notices that she has a Forty Thieves tattoo on her shoulder. Although the Thieves, a band of raiders once led by Sinbad's father, are now dead, Ameer admits that their heirs have banded together, and Jiddah deduces that the message went to them. At dawn, Sinbad and Omar learn that their execution is to proceed as scheduled, but they escape the dungeon and fight their way to the Khalif's chambers. There, Sinbad offers to retrieve Kristina in exchange for his and Omar's freedom, some gold and a promise that he will be made second in command in Bagdad. The Khalif agrees and Sinbad rides off with Omar, unaware that Jiddah, having heard his exchange with the Khalif, is alerting Murad of his plan.

Later, while resting in the desert, Sinbad and Omar are joined by Ameer, who reveals that Murad and his men are traveling in disguise with a caravan of merchants and that the Forty Thieves will attack them at first camp. Omar and Sinbad ride to the camp ahead of the caravan, and Sinbad has Omar bury him in the spot where he thinks Kristina's tent will be placed. Breathing through a reed, Sinbad remains buried in the Tartars' camp, far from Kristina's tent, until Murad unwittingly plucks his reed from the sand. Sinbad is forced to surface but manages to sneak into Kristina's tent and free her.

As Sinbad, Omar and Kristina ride off, the Forty Thieves, who are all women, attack the camp and reclaim Simon's bottles. Omar, Sinbad and Kristina then go to the Forty Thieves's cave and, using the cry "open sesame," signals a donkey named Sesame to open the "door." After arranging with Ghenia, the raiders' leader, Sinbad reunites with Ameer, but when he refuses to have "eyes only for her," Ameer rejects him. Just then, Murad's men advance on the cave, and Sinbad quickly hypnotizes Kristina, who has fallen in love with Omar, and concocts some Greek fire using Simon's chemicals. Hurling torches coated with the explosive, the Thieves, Sinbad and Omar cripple Murad and his men. Sinbad then defeats Murad in a sword fight, and victory is declared. Later, Sinbad convinces the women to go with him to Bagdad and make peace with the Khalif. At the palace, the Khalif waits for Sinbad with Jiddah, whose duplicity he has yet to realize, preparing to execute him for failing his mission.

When Sinbad appears with Kristina and a bevy of beautiful raiders, however, the Khalif embraces him and orders Jiddah to be de-tongued. At Sinbad's behest, Omar is made the royal poet, the Thieves are pardoned, and Sinbad is installed as second in command. Then as a final request, Sinbad asks Ameer to be his bride.

Production
The filming began in May 1953. Although the credited cast was chosen through auditioning, a lot of the harem girls, tartar girls, slave girls, trumpeters, and raiders were selected through a series of pageants and contests that Howard Hughes either saw or held. Joan Pastin, Marvleen Prentice, and Dawn Oney were chosen through a contest in Modern Screen arranged by Howard Hughes, while several others were selected because they were finalists in Queen of the Los Angeles Home Show of 1952. Sally Forrest was cast after Piper Laurie fell ill, while Vincent Price was on contract with RKO Studios when he was given the role of Omar Khayyam. Dee Gee Sparks and Nancy Dunn were cast in walk-on roles because their fathers (Robert Sparks and Linwood Dunn) were the producers of the film. Leonteen Danies was cast as a slave girl after being spotted at a dance academy.

Lili St. Cyr's voice was dubbed in the film at the request of Howard Hughes.

Cast
 Dale Robertson as Sinbad
 Sally Forrest as Ameer
 Vincent Price as Omar Khayyám
 Lili St. Cyr as Nerissa
 Mari Blanchard as Kristina
 Leon Askin as Khalif
 Raymond Greenleaf as Simon Aristides
 Mary Ellen Bromfield as Dancer (credited as Kalantan)
 Nejla Ates as Dancer
 Pat Sheehan as Harem Girl
 Jackie Loughery as Harem Girl
 Carol Brewster as Harem Girl
 Mary Morlas as Harem Girl
 Joy Langstaff as Tartar Girl
 Kim Novak as Raider
 Roxanne Arlen as Raider
 Laurie Carroll as Arab Woman

Critical reception
The film, described by one critic as "a voyeur's delight", has St. Cyr as a principal member of a Baghdad harem populated with dozens of nubile starlets.

It was condemned by the Catholic Legion of Decency.

See also
List of American films of 1955

References

External links
 
 
 
 

1955 films
American fantasy adventure films
1950s English-language films
1950s fantasy adventure films
Films based on Sinbad the Sailor
American 3D films
1950s 3D films
Films scored by Victor Young
Films set in Baghdad
Films directed by Ted Tetzlaff
Films with screenplays by Aubrey Wisberg
1950s American films